The Basketball Association of Singapore (BAS) is the governing body of basketball in Singapore.

History
Basketball was introduced to Singapore as early as 1925 and was played in schools. The Singapore Basketball and Volleyball Association was established in 1934 to further promote the sport and the organization was responsible for organizing the Malaysia and Singapore Basketball Championship. The association was later replaced in 1939 by the Chinese Sports Improvement Council, which was considered by the Basketball Association of Singapore to be the first instance of its organization.

After the resolution of the World War II in 1946 which affected the promotion of basketball, Goh Chye Hin set up the Singapore Amateur Basketball Association (SABA). It's men's national team participated in the 1956 Summer Olympics.

SABA became a member of FIBA Asia in 1961 and its men's team began participating in the ABC Championship (now FIBA Asia Cup). It renamed itself as the Basketball Association of Singapore (BAS) in 1967.

Tournaments organised 
  National Basketball League (Men and Women)
 Merlion Cup
 Junior Basketball Championships Boys (U-18, U-17, U-16, U-15)
 Junior Basketball Championships Girls (U-18, U-17, U-16, U-15)
 ActiveSG-BAS National Masters

National team
Men's (Senior)

Current roster
Roster for the 2019 SEA Games.

Past roster
Scroll down to see more.
Roster for the 2017 SEABA Championship.

Depth chart
 

Roster at the FIBA Asia Cup 2021 Pre-Qualifiers (Eastern Region).

(U18/U19, U16/U17, 3x3)

Women's (Senior, U18/U19, U16/U17, 3x3)

References

Basketball
Basketball in Singapore